Semysmauchenius is a genus of spiders in the Mecysmaucheniidae family. It was first described in 1984 by Forster & Platnick. , it contains only one Chilean species, Semysmauchenius antillanca.

References

Mecysmaucheniidae
Monotypic Araneomorphae genera
Spiders of South America
Endemic fauna of Chile